"Yes We Can Can" is a funk song written by Allen Toussaint, and first released by Lee Dorsey in 1970. It was popularized when it was recorded by the American R&B girl group the Pointer Sisters.

Lee Dorsey original
"Yes We Can" was recorded by Lee Dorsey on his album Yes We Can (album), released by Polydor in 1970 and also released as a single, and co-produced with Allen Toussaint.

Background to The Pointer Sisters cover
A cover of "Yes We can" re-titled "Yes We Can Can" was recorded by The Pointer Sisters. It was producer David Rubinson's suggestion that the Pointer Sisters record the song. As Rubinson said, "I loved almost everything Allen Toussaint ever wrote, and "Yes We Can Can" was one of the songs the Pointer Sisters recorded as a demo while they were seeking a label deal.

"Yes We Can Can" was one of the first tracks the group cut in fall 1972 for their debut album. Its basic track was recorded at Pacific Recording Studio in San Francisco. The sessions were eventually moved to Studio A of Wally Heider Recording Studio in San Francisco, and Rubinson is unclear as to whether or not further recording for "Yes We Can Can" was done there.

Released in February 1973, the song became the Pointers' first hit single, reaching No. 11 on the Billboard Hot 100 and No. 12 on the Hot Soul Songs chart.

Personnel
Lead vocals by Anita Pointer
Background vocals by Anita Pointer, Ruth Pointer, Bonnie Pointer and June Pointer
Written by Allen Toussaint
Produced by David Rubinson
Instrumentation - DRUMS: Gaylord Birch, GUITAR: Willie Fulton, BASS: Dexter C. Plates

Charts

Other covers
Mel & Tim, on the album Mel & Tim in 1973.
José Feliciano, on the album Compartments in 1973.
 Rap group Treacherous Three as a single in 1983.
Alyson Williams as a single (her first solo single after leaving Affair) in 1986.
Sly and Robbie on the album Rhythm Killers in 1987.
 Taral Hicks, Chantay Savage, LaShanda Reese and The Pointer Sisters recorded the song for the soundtrack The Associate in 1996
Allen Toussaint, on the album Our New Orleans: A Benefit Album for the Gulf Coast in 2005.
Harry Connick, Jr. on the album Oh, My NOLA in 2007.
Taylor Hicks on the album The Distance in 2009.
Donnie McClurkin on the album Donnie McClurkin in 1996.
Marc Broussard on the album S.O.S.: Save Our Soul in 2007.
Young-Holt Unlimited on the album Oh Girl in 1972.
Joss Stone presented the song for free download on her official website in January 2013.
Kokomo have featured the song in their set lists from the 70s to the present time. It is included on the To Be Cool recording of early rehearsals and the Live From the Venue '81 album
Young@Heart on the album Mostly Live in 2008. It was also featured in their documentary film Young@Heart.
Amy Helm opening for The Tedeschi-Trucks band 2018 tour.
Maceo Parker on the album Soul Food: Cooking With Maceo in 2020.

References

External links
[ Yes We Can Can - The Pointer Sisters] at Allmusic

1973 singles
Funk songs
The Pointer Sisters songs
Lee Dorsey songs
Songs written by Allen Toussaint
1973 songs
Blue Thumb Records singles